Kuthuparamba or Koothuparamba is a town and a municipality in the Kannur district, state of Kerala, India. It is about 24 km south-east of Kannur and 14 km east of Thalassery.

History

Kuthuparamba was part of Kottayam dynasty under the reign of Pazhassi Raja in the midievel period. Since the British captured Kuthuparamba area, the area fell under British rule was formed as Kottayam taluk. Thalassery – Coorg road which was made by the British for sending troops to Mysore also plays an important role in the history of Kuthuparamba. Kottayam dynasty had given much importance to the fine arts of Kathakali and Chakyar Koothu. 

It is believed that the name Kuthuparamba was derived from the words ‘Koothu’ and ‘Paramba’ (the ground where the Koothu was performed). This name was given to the complete area by British Military, there was a cantonment and was known as Kuthuparamba Cantonment. The remnants of past history are still alive in the structure like Court complex, Inspection Banglow, Maroli ghat.
 
Kuthuparamba was formed as Panchayat in the year 1939 by fixing Kuthuparamba revenue village as its boundary. The first president of the Panchayat was Dr. C. Kumaran. Kuthuparamba was established as a Municipality on 01.04.1990.

Demographics
As of 2011 Census, Kuthuparamba Municipality with an area of  had a population of 29,619. Kuthuparamba is the 3rd most densely populated municipal town in Kannur district. Males constitute 45.4% of the population and females 54.6%. Kuthuparamba had an average literacy rate of 96.76%, higher than the national urban average of 79% and state average of 94%: male literacy was 98.1%, and female literacy was 95.6%. In Kuthuparamba, 10.5% of the population was under 6 years of age.

Religion
As of 2011 India census, Kuthuparamba Municipality had total population of 29,619 among which 68.98% are Hindus, 28.94% Muslims, 1.94% Christians and 0.14% others.

Administration
Kuthuparamba Municipality is a part of Kuthuparamba Assembly constituency under Vatakara Lok Sabha constituency.

Municipal Wards
The town is administered by Kuthuparamba Municipality, headed by a chairman. For administrative purposes, the town is divided into 28 wards. The ruling party is CPI(M) with M. Sukumaran as the municipal chairman.

Law and order
The municipality comes under jurisdiction of Kuthuparamba Police Station, which was formed in the year 1871. The station limit is 72.68 km² covering  5 villages viz Kuthuparamba, Paduvilayi, Pathiriyad, Kandamkunnu and Mangattidam which includes Kuthuparamba municipality and panchayats like Vengad and Mangattidom.

Kuthuparamba is one of the three police sub divisions in Kannur city formed on 18-02-2021. Kuthuparamba sub division comprises police stations,  Kuthuparamba, Mattanur, Mattanur Airport, Kolavelloor, Panoor and Kannavam, with an area of 433.09 km², which are politically sensitive areas.

Kuthuparamba have a special sub jail which is a renovation of the old sub jail building established since British rule in 1871.

Courts complexes in Kuthuparamba

 Judicial First Class Majistrate Court, Kuthuparamba
 Munsiff Court, Kuthuparamba

Educational Institutions

 Nirmalagiri College, Kuthuparamba 

 College of Applied Science, Kuthuparamba 

 MG college, Kuthuparamba

 MES College, Naravoor

 Government ITI, Kuthuparamba

 Rani Jai Higher Secondary School, Nirmalagiri

 Government Higher Secondary School, Kuthuparamba

 Kuthuparamba UP School

 Amrita Vidyalayam Kuthuparamba

 South Kuthuparamba U P School

 ATDC Valiyavelicham

 Sree Narayana English Medium High School

Notable people

Filmmakers: Sreenivasan, Vineeth Sreenivasan, Dhyan Sreenivasan

Artist - K.G. Subramanyan

Koothuparamba Police firing

Koothuparamba Police firing was an incident that took place in Koothuparamba town in Kerala on 25 November 1994 when police opened fire on DYFI protestors who protested against commoditisation and privatisation of education policy by the UDF government led by the Congress. Police resorted to firing when the protesters blocked minister M.V. Raghavan, who was in town to inaugurate an event.

Political violence
This area is an epicenter of political violence between Communist Party of India (Marxist) (CPI(M)) and the Rashtriya Swayamsevak Sangh (RSS) have been fighting in this area for supremacy for the last 50 years.  Clashes in 2008 left seven people killed and many have been injured. The High Court of Kerala called this manslaughter a "compelling sport" and suggested permanent deployment of Central forces in the affected areas.

Transportation
Thalassery is the nearest railway station, 14 km away from the town. Kuthuparamba is a town en route Thalassery-Coorg (SH30) road (commonly known as TC Road). Nearest airport is The Kannur International Airport which is 15 km away. It has the road connectivity with major tourist attractions like Aralam, Mysore, Mangalore, Ooty, Bangalore etc.

Linkage & connectivity
Kuthuparamba town is a major junction well connected by two state highways and a major district road to Wayanad.
There are two state highways passing through the town, namely SH-30 (Thalassery – Coorg inter-state highway) and SH-38 (Kannur – Kozhikode road). These two roads act as major corridors of the town and possess good connectivity. Considerable volume of traffic from Karnataka passes through the town. In addition to this, other district roads and municipal roads exist within the town.

Kerala government has proposed to construct a ring road in Kuthuparamba to reduce traffic congestion in the town.

Industrial growth centre
Kannur Industrial Growth Centre is located in Valiyavelicham near Kuthuparamba. It is one of the three IGCs in the state under Kerala Industrial Infrastructure Development Corporation (KSIDC).

Kannur IGC have well developed infrastructure facilities, including power, water, and roads, facilitating setting up of solid waste/plastic recycling and processing units by interested entrepreneurs. A plastic recycling unit is operating in the Kannur IGC. Similarly, the KSIDC has allocated land for two recycling units and biomedical waste treatment unit, which are being set up.

Also, Kerala Agro Machinery Corporation Ltd (KAMCO) is located at Valiyavelicham facilitates setting up of power tiller manufacturing units. The products being manufactured from the unit include new generation power tillers with self-starter, garden tiller and brush cutter with diesel engine.

Political parties
Indian Union Muslim League
Communist Party of India (Marxist)
Communist Party of India
Indian National Congress
BJP
Aam Aadmi Party (AAP)
JD(S)
Indian National League (INL)

See also
 Kannavam
 Kolayad
 Pinarayi
 Mavilayi
 Thrippangottur
 Peravoor
 Kottayam-Malabar
 Mangattidam
 Pathiriyad
 Manantheri
 Cheruvanchery
 Mambram
 Kadamkunnu
 Nirmalagiri

References

External links

http://www.koothuparambamunicipality.in/

Cities and towns in Kannur district